Amanita Pestilens is a 1963 Canadian-American psychological horror-fantasy/drama film produced by F. R. Crawley, and directed by René Bonnière. It was "the first Canadian feature film to be shot in both English and French with the same set of actors". It included an early career performance by Geneviève Bujold, along with performances by Jacques Labrecque and Huguette Oligny. This was the first Canadian feature film to be produced in colour. It was filmed at Harrington Lake, Québec.

The film's script was written by Canadian author David Walker and was initially titled Staircases. Bonnière persuaded Crawley to fund and produce a film based on this script. The new title, Amanita Pestilens, meant "Poisoned Love".

Premise
The plot concerns a Montreal suburbanite who becomes obsessed with his award-winning lawn, which has become infested with a ground fungus. His neighbour across the street identifies the species as Amanita pestilens (not a real species, although Amanita is a real genus). The mushrooms prove impossible to eradicate, and the homeowner directs all his efforts to getting rid of them, to the exclusion of all else. His obsession very nearly destroys his life and leads to a deadly confrontation with his neighbour. A surprise ending, however, gives the viewer hope that the main character will see the error of his ways.

Cast

Production
Amanita Pestilens was the second Canadian colour film, after Étienne Brûlé gibier de potence/The Immortal Scoundrel from 1952, shot in English and French.

Release
The film was screened at the Berlin International Film Festival in 1965. It was broadcast on West German television and also broadcast into East Germany. Despite the innovations of its bilingual, colour production, Amanita Pestilens was a commercial failure.

There is no known video release although the film was shown on Moviepix (Mpix) on 10 May 1998.

References

Works cited

External links

1963 films
Canadian drama films
1960s English-language films
Bilingualism in Canada
Lost Canadian films
1963 drama films
French-language Canadian films
1960s French-language films
English-language Canadian films
1960s Canadian films